This article displays the squads for the 2021 World Women's Handball Championship. Each team had a provisional list of 35 players. Each roster consisted of 18 players, of whom 16 may be fielded for each match.

Age, club, caps and goals as of 1 December 2021.

Group A

Angola
The squad was announced on 11 November 2021.

Head coach: Filipe Cruz

France
A 20-player squad was announced on 29 October 2021. It was cut to 18 on 29 November 2021.

Head coach: Olivier Krumbholz

Montenegro
A 19-player squad was announced on 22 November 2021.

Head coach: Bojana Popović

Slovenia
A 26-player squad was announced on 16 November 2021. It was cut to 19 on 25 November 2021.

Head coach:  Dragan Adžić

Group B

Cameroon
A 22-player squad was announced on 5 October 2021. The final roster was revealed on 27 November 2021.

Head coach: Serge Christian Guébogo

Poland
A 20-player squad was announced on 10 November 2021. It was cut to 17 on 25 November 2021. Julia Niewiadomska replaced Magda Więckowska on 30 November 2021.

Head coach:  Arne Senstad

Russian Handball Federation
A 20-player squad was announced on 15 November 2021.

Head coach: Lyudmila Bodniyeva

Serbia
A 23-player squad was announced on 15 November 2021. It was cut to 18 on 30 November 2021.

Head coach:   Uroš Bregar

Group C

Iran
A 27-player squad was announced on 17 November 2021. It was cut to 19 on 23 November 2021.

Head coach: Ezzatollah Razmgar

Kazakhstan
Head coach: Lyazzat Ishanova

Norway
The squad was announced on 9 November 2021. On 22 November, Stine Skogrand announced her pregnancy, and withdrew from the squad. On 3 December, Malin Aune, Emilie Hovden and Rikke Granlund were added to a now 18-player squad.

Head coach:  Thorir Hergeirsson

Romania
A 21-player squad was announced on 16 November 2021. It was cut to 18 on 30 November 2021. On 4 December 2021, Alexandra Badea replaced Oana Borș in the squad due to a knee injury in the opening match.

Head coach: Adrian Vasile

Group D

Netherlands
A 21-player squad was announced on 8 November 2021. It was cut to 18 on 28 November 2021.

Head coach: Monique Tijsterman

Puerto Rico
Head coach: Camilo Estevez

Sweden
The squad was announced on 3 November 2021. On 22 November, Evelina Källhage replaced Mathilda Lundström due to an injury. On 30 November, it was announced Daniela de Jong and Olivia Mellegård were added to the squad. On 9 December, Evelina Eriksson replaced Martina Thörn due to an injury.

Head coach: Tomas Axnér

Uzbekistan
Head coach: Zafar Azimov

Group E

Czech Republic
A 21-player squad was announced on 12 November 2021. The squad was cut down to 18 players on 30 November 2021.

Head coach: Jan Bašný

Germany
The squad was announced on 15 November 2021.

Head coach:  Henk Groener

Hungary
A 21-player squad was announced on 10 November 2021. It was cut to 20 on 17 November 2021 and again to 18 on 25 November 2021.

Head coach: Vladimir Golovin

Slovakia
A 20-player squad was announced on 16 November 2021. The official squad was announced 30 November 2021.

Head coach: Pavol Streicher

Group F

Congo
A 21-player squad was announced on 14 November 2021.

Head coach: Younes Tatby

Denmark
The squad was announced on 2 November 2021. On 3 December 2021, Michala Møller replaced Mia Rej in the squad due to a knee injury in the opening match.

Head coach: Jesper Jensen

South Korea
Head coach: Jang In-ik

Tunisia
A 17-player squad was announced on 4 October 2021.

Head coach: Moez Ben Amor

Group G

Brazil
A 18-player squad was announced on 22 October 2021.

Head coach: Cristiano Silva

Croatia
A 19-player squad was announced on 9 November 2021. It was cut to 18 on 22 November 2021 and again to 16 on 28 November 2021.

Head coach: Nenad Šoštarić

Japan
A 20-player squad was announced 4 November 2021.

Head coach: Shigeo Kusumoto

Paraguay
The squad was announced 17 November 2021.

Head coach: Neri Vera

Group H

Argentina
A 18-player squad was announced 1 November 2021.

Head coach: Eduardo Gallardo

Austria
The squad was announced on 10 November 2021.

Head coach: Herbert Müller

China
Head coach:  Kim Gap-soo

Spain
A 18-player squad was announced on 15 November 2021.

Head coach: José Ignacio Prades

Statistics

Coaches representation by country
Coaches in bold represent their own country.

References

World Handball Championship squads
2021 in women's handball